Dardanus gemmatus, the jeweled anemone hermit crab, is a species of hermit crab native to tropical reefs surrounding the Indo-Pacific, typically at depths of .

References

External links
 
 Photo of two Dardanus gemmatus

Hermit crabs
Crustaceans described in 1848
Taxa named by Henri Milne-Edwards